Maja Veršeć (born 23 October 1916, date of death unknown) was a Croatian-Yugoslavian gymnast. She competed in the women's artistic team all-around event at the 1936 Summer Olympics.

References

External links
 

1916 births
Year of death missing
Croatian female artistic gymnasts
Olympic gymnasts of Yugoslavia
Gymnasts at the 1936 Summer Olympics
Sportspeople from Zagreb